Elaphrus angusticollis is a species of ground beetle in the subfamily Elaphrinae. It was described by R. F. Sahlberg in 1844.

References

Elaphrinae
Beetles described in 1844